Events in the year 2008 in the Palestinian territories.

Incumbents
Palestinian National Authority (non-state administrative authority)
 President – Mahmoud Abbas (PLO)
 Prime Minister –
 Prime Minister of the Palestinian National Authority (in the West Bank) – Salam Fayyad (Third Way) (emergency rule)
 Prime Minister of the Palestinian National Authority (in the Gaza Strip) – Ismail Haniyeh (Hamas) (in rebellion against the Palestinian National Authority)

Events

 January 24 – Two Palestinian Arabs infiltrate a religious seminary and stab three students in the West Bank settlement of Kfar Etzion before being shot dead. 
 January 24 – Palestinian Arab gunmen open fire on Israelis outside the Shuafat refugee camp on the outskirts of Jerusalem, killing a border police officer and seriously wounding a female officer.
 February 4 – 2008 Dimona suicide bombing: A suicide attack carried out by Hamas at a shopping centre in Dimona, Israel. One Israeli elderly woman is killed in the attack while nine other people are wounded (one of them critically). Hamas claims responsibility for the attack.
 February 27 – Over 46 Qassam rockets are fired by Palestinian Arab militants into the Western Negev and Israel's Southern Mediterranean coast, many of them hit the city of Ashkelon and the town of Sderot, among other Israeli towns and villages in the area. One of the rockets that landes in a parking lot at the Sapir Academic College killing 47-year-old Israeli student, Ronni Yechia.
 February 28 – March 3 – Operation Hot Winter: Israel Defense Forces military campaign in the Gaza Strip is launched in response to the constant firing of Qassam rockets from the Strip by Hamas militants.
 March 6 – Mercaz HaRav massacre: Eight Israeli civilians are killed and 9 wounded when a Palestinian Arab attacker opens fire at a Jewish seminary in Jerusalem.
 May 14 – A Katyusha rocket is fired at the Israeli city of Ashqelon striking a clinic on the third floor of the Huzot shopping mall, serious wounding three people, moderately wounding two and with eleven other people suffering minor wounds. The Popular Front for the Liberation of Palestine claims responsibility.
 June 6 – An Israeli man is killed and four other people are wounded when Hamas militants in the Gaza Strip fire a mortar shell at kibbutz Nirim in the western Negev desert.
 July 2 – Jerusalem bulldozer attack: A Palestinian Arab resident of east Jerusalem attacks several cars on the Jaffa Road in Jerusalem using a front-end loader (erroneously referred to as a bulldozer in the media), killing three people and wounding at least 30 other pedestrians, before being shot to death.
 July 16 – Hezbollah swaps the bodies of 199 Palestinian Arab and Lebanese militants, four Hezbollah prisoners captured during the 2006 Lebanon war and the Lebanese Druze militant Samir Kuntar in exchange for the bodies of the Israeli soldiers Ehud Goldwasser and Eldad Regev.
 August 25 – Israel releases 199 Palestinian Arab prisoners as a goodwill gesture to the President of the Palestinian National Authority, Mahmoud Abbas, as the United States Secretary of State, Condoleezza Rice, visits the area.
 September 22 – At least 19 people are wounded when a Palestinian Arab drives his car into a crowd of IDF soldiers at a busy intersection in Jerusalem. The driver is shot and killed at the scene by an Israeli soldier.
 October 28, 2008 – Ersal Commercial Center, ground breaking, co-sponsored by the Palestine Investment Fund (PIF) and Saudi real estate company, The Land Holding.
 December 27, 2008 – January 18, 2009 – Operation Cast Lead: A large-scale three-week IDF military campaign in the Gaza Strip seriously damages the paramilitary infrastructure of Hamas. Israel claims that the strikes are a response to frequent Qassam rocket and mortar fire from the Strip on Israel's southern civilian communities.

Notable deaths

 January 26 – George Habash, 81, Palestinian founder of the Popular Front for the Liberation of Palestine, heart attack.
 February 15 – Ayman al-Fayed, 42, Palestinian commander of al-Quds Brigades, explosion.
 April 16 – Fadel Shana'a, 23, Palestinian Reuters cameraman, flechette shell.
 August 9 – Mahmoud Darwish, 67, Palestinian poet, complications from open heart surgery.

Notes

See also
 2008 in Israel
 2007–present blockade of the Gaza Strip
 Timeline of the Israeli–Palestinian conflict in 2008

 
Palestinian territories
Years of the 21st century in the Palestinian territories
2000s in the Palestinian territories
Palestinian territories